Eugene Henry Gallette (February 22, 1919 - November 19, 1976) was a professional basketball player. He spent one season in the Basketball Association of America (BAA) as a member of the Washington Capitols during the 1946–47 season.

His name is still listed as "Gillette" in some basketball encyclopedias, but that is an error that has been carried over for many years.

BAA career statistics

Regular season

References

External links
 

1919 births
1976 deaths
Basketball players from San Francisco
Undrafted National Basketball Association players
Washington Capitols players